The canton of Saint-Florentin is an administrative division of the Yonne department, central France. Its borders were modified at the French canton reorganisation which came into effect in March 2015. Its seat is in Saint-Florentin.

It consists of the following communes:
 
Beaumont
Beugnon
Butteaux
Chailley
Chemilly-sur-Yonne
Chéu
Germigny
Hauterive
Héry
Jaulges
Lasson
Mont-Saint-Sulpice
Neuvy-Sautour
Ormoy
Percey
Saint-Florentin
Seignelay
Sormery
Soumaintrain
Turny
Vergigny
Villiers-Vineux

References

Cantons of Yonne